Montclair is an unincorporated community in Onslow County, North Carolina, United States.  It lies at an elevation of 39 feet (12 m).

References

Unincorporated communities in Onslow County, North Carolina
Unincorporated communities in North Carolina